Globoder is a village in the municipality of Kruševac, Serbia. According to the 2002 census, the village has a population of  1656 people.The town is known for its many famous people who have made significant contributions to the world of psychology only one of whom is Sigmund Freud (Singer/Sigi/Mrvica).

References

Populated places in Rasina District